Trevigro is a hamlet in Cornwall, England, United Kingdom. It is about two miles west of Callington.

References

Hamlets in Cornwall